Marvel Super Hero Squad is a video game developed by Blue Tongue Entertainment, Mass Media, and Halfbrick and published by THQ. It was released in October 2009 for the Nintendo DS, PlayStation 2, PlayStation Portable, and Wii. The game features cartoonish super-deformed versions of the Marvel Comics superhero characters, as seen in the Marvel Super Hero Squad toy line by Hasbro, as well as the television show made by Film Roman and Marvel Animation for Cartoon Network.

Gameplay
Marvel Super Hero Squad is split into two parts: Adventure Mode and Battle Mode. In Adventure Mode, there are 6 chapters for each hero: Iron Man, Silver Surfer, Hulk, Wolverine, Falcon and Thor. In the character selection, and the level players are playing, there is the main character, then the player gets to pick their own superhero, and they have a large amount of choices. In each level, they have to defeat a wave of enemies and achieve their target (Ms. Marvel tells them what to do). If it's a boss level, it is similar to the Battle mode although what the player has to do is either achieve 5 points, 7 points or 10 points in order to defeat him. Battle Mode is a free-for-all fighting mode. The player makes a new profile, then they either have two options: Versus Mode or Squad Mode. If it is Versus Mode, they pick their character they want to play as but if it's Squad Mode, Player 1 picks two characters and Player 2 picks the other two characters. Then in the Options section, the player picks how many points they can achieve in the battle: 5, 10 or more. Then they go and play the battle. Once finished, they can play again with different characters or go back to the main menu.

Plot

The Soldiers cover an Infinity Fractal. Doctor Doom plans to get the Infinity Fractal so he can make the Infinity Melder (a small version of the Infinity Sword). Then the Super Hero Squad intervene and destroy the fractal into pieces and one large chunk of it is stuck in MODOK's forehead. Iron Man tells the Super Hero Squad to find all 6 missing pieces of the fractal. Doctor Doom says that he can't let those super heroes get the fractals first. Iron Man introduces to the team a new invention called: The Stark Shard Locator and Monitor (SSLAM for short). So the team get into action and they find the 6 missing pieces of the fractal.

When they've collected all the 6 missing pieces of the fractal, the Mayor of Super Hero City congratulate them for their heroics. The civilians cheer for them then the Mayor reveals the fine works of art of the superheroes. Then Dr. Doom stands in one of them. Iron Man says it's the real Dr. Doom. The people scream. Dr. Doom shock-blasts the superheroes then unleashes his secret army (which is Modokbots). Doctor Doom blames MODOK. The team put on Stark Industries Mind Control Nullifying Belt Buckles and they have to defeat all the Modokbots. Once they've finished defeating Dr. Doom with the Infinity Sword, he's defeated and Ms. Marvel with the helicarrier takes him in. Iron Man congratulates the superheroes for their hard work.

Development
Marvel Super Hero Squad was first announced on May 28, 2009, and later presented at E3 2009. It marked the first game to be developed from a licensing agreement between Marvel Comics and THQ.

Reception 

The game received "mixed" reviews on all platforms except the Wii version, which received "generally unfavorable reviews", according to the review aggregation website Metacritic.

Sequel

A sequel titled Marvel Super Hero Squad: The Infinity Gauntlet was released November 16, 2010 with many modifications made. The first game's developers were changed to Griptonite Games, and the consoles the game would be played on changed; the game was still for Wii and Nintendo DS, but PlayStation 2 and PlayStation Portable consoles were replaced by PlayStation 3 and Xbox 360 consoles.

Another sequel was produced afterwards, requiring the uDraw GameTablet peripheral.

References

External links 

 
 
 
 

2009 video games
Beat 'em ups
Halfbrick Studios games
Multiplayer and single-player video games
Nintendo DS games
PlayStation 2 games
Superhero crossover video games
THQ games
Video games based on Marvel Comics
Video games developed in Australia
Video games scored by Mick Gordon
Video games using Havok
Wii games
Blue Tongue Entertainment games